Learning sciences (LS) is an interdisciplinary field that works to further scientific, humanistic, and critical theoretical understanding of learning as well as to engage in the design and implementation of learning innovations, and the improvement of instructional methodologies. LS research traditionally focuses on cognitive-psychological, social-psychological, cultural-psychological and critical theoretical foundations of human learning, as well as practical design of learning environments. Major contributing fields include cognitive science, computer science, educational psychology, anthropology, and applied linguistics. Over the past decade, researchers have expanded their focus to include the design of curricula, informal learning environments, instructional methods, and policy innovations.

Domain definition 
As an emerging discipline, LS is still in the process of defining itself. Accordingly, the identity of the field is multifaceted, and varies from institution to institution. However, the International Society of the Learning Sciences (ISLS) summarizes the field as follows: "Researchers in the interdisciplinary field of learning sciences, born during the 1990s, study learning as it happens in real-world situations and how to better facilitate learning in designed environments – in school, online, in the workplace, at home, and in informal environments. Learning sciences research may be guided by constructivist, social-constructivist, socio-cognitive, and socio-cultural theories of learning." ISLS has a large worldwide membership, is affiliated with two international journals: Journal of the Learning Sciences, and International Journal of Computer Supported Collaborative Learning, and sponsors the biennial Computer Supported Collaborative Learning conference and International Conference of the Learning Sciences on alternate years.

Although controlled experimental studies and rigorous qualitative research have long been employed in learning sciences, LS researchers often use design-based research methods. Interventions are conceptualized and implemented in natural settings to test the ecological validity of dominant theory, as well as to develop new theories and frameworks for conceptualizing learning, instruction, design processes, and educational reform. LS research strives to generate principles of practice beyond the particular features of an educational innovation to solve real educational problems, giving LS its interventionist character.

History 

Several significant events have contributed to the international development of learning sciences. Perhaps the earliest history can be traced back to the cognitive revolution.

In the United States, an important effort to create a graduate program in learning sciences took place in 1983 when Jan Hawkins and Roy Pea proposed a joint program between Bank Street College and The New School for Social Research. Called "Psychology, Education, and Technology" (PET), the program was supported through a planning grant from the Alfred P. Sloan Foundation. However, the program required hiring new faculty, and the institutions never established such a program. In 1988, Roger Schank's arrival at Northwestern University contributed to the development of the Institute for Learning Sciences. In 1991, Northwestern initiated the first LS doctoral program, designed and launched by Pea as its first director. The program accepted their first student cohort in1992; following Pea's new position as dean, Brian Reiser took over the program directorship. Since that time, many additional high-quality LS graduate programs have appeared globally, and the field continues to gain recognition as an innovative and influential field for education research and design.

The Journal of the Learning Sciences was first published in 1991, with Janet Kolodner as founding editor. Yasmin Kafai and Cindy Hmelo-Silver took over as editors in 2009, followed by Iris Tabak and Joshua Radinsky as editors in 2013. The International Journal of Computer-Supported Collaborative Learning was established as a separate journal in 2006, edited by Gerry Stahl and Freiderich Hesse. Although these journals were relatively new within education research, they rapidly escalated into the upper ranks of the Educational Research section of the Social Sciences Citation Index impact factor rankings.

In August 1991, the Institute for the Learning Sciences hosted its first International Conference for the Learning Sciences (ICLS) at Northwestern University (edited by Lawrence Birnbaum and published by the AACE, but no longer available). In 1994, ICLS hosted the first biennial meeting, which also took place at Northwestern University. The International Society of the Learning Sciences was later established in 2002.

Distinguishing characteristics

By integrating multiple fields, learning sciences extends beyond other closely related fields in distinguishable ways. For example, learning sciences extends beyond psychology, in that it also accounts for and contributes to computational, sociological and anthropological approaches to the study of learning. Similarly, LS draws inspiration from cognitive science, and is regarded as a branch of cognitive science; however, it gives particular attention to improving education through the study, modification, and creation of new technologies and learning environments, and various interacting and emergent factors that potentially influence the learning of humans.

Many LS researchers employ design-based research methodology. The growing acceptance of design-based research methodology as a means for study is often viewed as a significant factor that distinguishes LS from many of the fields that contribute to it. By including design-based research within its methodological toolkit, learning sciences qualifies as a "design science", sharing common characteristics with other design sciences that employ design science such as engineering and computer science. Learning sciences is also considered by some as having some degree of overlap with instructional design, although the two communities developed in different ways, at times emphasizing different programs of research. These differences are described in greater detail in a 2004 special issue of Educational Technology in 2004. 

Design-based research is by no means the only research methodology used in the field.  Many other methodologies—including computational modeling, experimental and quasi-experimental research, and non-interventionist ethnographic-style qualitative research methodologies—have long been and continue to be employed in learning sciences.

See also 
 
 
 
 
 Education sciences
 
 
 
 
 Pedagogy

References

Anderson, J. R., Reder, L. M., & Simon, H. A. (1996). Situated learning and education. Educational Researcher, 25(4), 5-11.
Brown, A. L. (1992). Design experiments: Theoretical and methodological challenges in creating complex interventions in classroom settings. The Journal of the Learning Sciences, 2(2), 141-178
Carr-Chellman, A. & Hoadley, C. (Eds.) Learning sciences and instructional systems: Beginning the dialogue [Special issue]. (2004). Educational Technology, 44(3).
Evans, M. A., Packer, M. J., & Sawyer, R. K. (Eds.) (2016). Reflections on the learning sciences: Past, present, and future. New York: Cambridge University Press.
Fischer, F., Hmelo-Silver, C. E., Goldman, S. R., & Reimann, P. (Eds.)(2018). International handbook of the learning sciences. New York: Routledge.
Greeno, J. G. (2006). Learning in activity. In R. K. Sawyer (ed.) The Cambridge handbook of the Learning Sciences (first edition) (pp. 79–96), Cambridge, MA: Cambridge University Press.
Greeno, J. G., Collins, A. M., & Resnick, L. (1996).  Cognition and learning.  In D. Berliner and R. Calfee (Eds.) Handbook of Educational Psychology, (pp. 15–46).  New York: MacMillan.
Lave, J. (1996). The practice of learning: The problem with "context." In S. Chaiklin & J. Lave (Eds.) Understanding practice: Perspectives on activity and context (pp. 3–32). Boston, MA: Cambridge University Press.
Lave, J., & Wenger, E. (1991). Situated learning: Legitimate peripheral participation. New York: Cambridge University Press.
Pea, R. (2016). The prehistory of the learning sciences. In Evans, M. A., Packer, M. P. (Eds.) Reflections on the learning sciences (pp. 32-58). New York: Cambridge University Press.
Sawyer, R. K. (2006). The Cambridge handbook of the learning sciences (first edition). New York: Cambridge University Press.
Sawyer, R. K. (2014). The Cambridge handbook of the learning sciences (second edition). New York: Cambridge University Press.
Sawyer, R. K. (2022). The Cambridge handbook of the learning sciences (third edition). New York: Cambridge University Press.
Sfard, A. (1998). On two metaphors for learning and the dangers of choosing just one. Educational Researcher, 27(2), 4-13.
Stahl, G., Koschmann, T., Suthers, D. (2006). Computer-supported collaborative learning: An historical perspective. In R. K. Sawyer (ed.) The Cambridge Handbook of the Learning Sciences (first edition) (pp. 79–96), New York: Cambridge University Press.

Cognitive science
Psychology of learning